Contest may refer to:

 Competition
 Will contest
 Contesting, amateur radio contesting (radiosport)

Film and television
 Contest (2013 film), an American film
 Contest (1932 film), a German sports film
 "The Contest", a 1992 season 4 episode of Seinfeld
 The Contest, episode of Baywatch 1996
 The Contest, episode of Harry's Law 2012
 The Contest, episode of Alpha House 2014
 The Contest, episode of Lassie 1954
 The Con Test, an Australian game show which airs on Network Ten
 "Contest" (Bottom), an episode of the British sitcom Bottom

Other uses
 Contest, Mayenne, a village and commune of the Mayenne département in France
 Contest,  a ship sunk in [[CSS Alabama's Indian Ocean Expeditionary Raid|CSS Alabama'''s Indian Ocean Expeditionary Raid]] in 1863
 Contest (1804 ship), an Australian ship sunk in 1807
 HMS Contest, the name of various ships of the British Royal Navy
 Contest'', a novel by Matthew Reilly
 The Contest (DC Comics), a comic book story arc
CONTEST, codename for the British government's counter-terrorism strategy

See also
Sweepstakes